Filippos Darlas (born 23 October 1983) is a Greek professional footballer who plays as a left-back for Apollon Dokimiou.

Club career

Superleague Greece
Born in Kenourgio, Greece, Darlas began his professional career 1999 in Panetolikos. In the 2001–02 season Darlas was transferred to Panathinaikos Athens but due to his relative young age (just 19 years old) he was sent on loan to the first Greek division team Kalithea and for the two following years to Markopoulo-based Third Division side F.C. Marko. In the 2004–05 season Darlas went to Apollon Smyrnis before returning to Panathinaikos and made his Champions League debut against Werder Bremen and FC Barcelona. During the transfer period in 2008 he moved to PAOK Salonika as an exchange to the transfer of Christos Melissis.

Brest
On 28 June 2010, Darlas signed for French club Stade Brestois 29 for one year with an option for a second. In January 2011, he joined Atromitos F.C. on loan.  In January 2012 he joined Ergotelis F.C.

On 18 July 2012, Darlas returned to Greece and former club Panetolikos, signing a one-year contract.

International career
Darlas was a main stay in the Under 21s making 14 consecutive appearances. In 2006, national coach Otto Rehhagel called him to wear his national team shirt for his first and only cap.

Honours
Panathinaikos
 Superleague Greece: 2009–10
 Greek Cup: 2010

Atromitos
 Greek Cup: runners up 2010–11

References

External links
 
 

1983 births
Living people
People from Aetolia-Acarnania
Association football fullbacks
Apollon Smyrnis F.C. players
Panathinaikos F.C. players
Panetolikos F.C. players
Kallithea F.C. players
PAOK FC players
Stade Brestois 29 players
Atromitos F.C. players
Ergotelis F.C. players
Super League Greece players
Ligue 1 players
Greek footballers
Greece international footballers
Greek expatriate footballers
Expatriate footballers in France
Footballers from Western Greece